a Japanese manga written by Ryu Mitsuse and illustrated by Keiko Takemiya.

Plot
On the planet of Astria in the Andromeda Galaxy the Cosmoralian Empire is about to marry Prince Ithaca to Ayodoya's Princess Lilia, in the process crowning him King Astralta III. Unfortunately the happy couple's honeymoon is interrupted when sinister machines from another planet land and invade Astria, intent on eradicating all life, controlling human minds, and terraforming the once-green planet into a mechanical wasteland inhabited only by artificial life forms. After the King and his ministers are assimilated by the alien machines, the Queen Lilia and her newborn son Prince Jimsa must flee Astria. However the natives of Astria are not aware that exiles from the planet of Murat (the source of the enemy) have actually been selectively breeding the royal lines and Prince Jimsa is the ultimate fruit of their efforts. He is destined to lead their resistance against the alien machines.

Reception
"It's a complicated mix of ideas. After Terra, though, nobody on this continent should be surprised by what Takemiya's capable of." — David F. Smith, Newtype USA.

References

Further reading

External links

1980 manga
1982 anime films
Fiction set in the Andromeda Galaxy
Drama anime and manga
Animated films based on manga
Keiko Takemiya
Kodansha manga
Manga adapted into films
Science fiction anime and manga
Vertical (publisher) titles
Asahi Sonorama manga
Shōnen manga
Extraterrestrials in anime and manga